Giorgio Fiocco (13 June 1931 – 31 July 2012) was an Italian physicist, known for the development of the Lidar for the remote sensing of the atmosphere.

In 1962 at MIT, together with Louis Smullin, Fiocco developed the first Lidar system, aiming a laser beam to the Moon and detecting the return pulse. Fiocco was full professor of geophysics at the University of Florence, then since 1974, professor of Terrestrial Physics at the Sapienza University of Rome. From 1994 to 1995 Fiocco was president of the Italian Space Agency. Fiocco pioneered the application of the Lidar to the remote sensing of the atmosphere.

He died in Rome on 31 July 2012.

Publications

References

 
 

1931 births
2012 deaths
Italian physicists
Scientists  from Rome
Atmospheric physicists